Jeffrey Hansel Wilson (born 7 December 1964) is an English former footballer who played as a defender in the Football League for Darlington and in non-league football for Ryhope CA.

References

1964 births
Living people
Footballers from South Shields
English footballers
Association football defenders
Darlington F.C. players
Sunderland Ryhope Community Association F.C. players
English Football League players